Public Law 113-154, informally known as the Protect Cemeteries Act, is a U.S. federal law which amended the findings of the International Religious Freedom Act of 1998 by including the desecration of cemeteries among the various violations of the right to religious freedom.

The bill was introduced in the United States House of Representatives as  during the 113th United States Congress. It was signed into law on August 8, 2014 by President Barack Obama.

Background

The International Religious Freedom Act of 1998 (as amended by Public Law 106–55, Public Law 106–113, Public Law 107–228, Public Law 108–332, and Public Law 108–458) was passed to promote religious freedom as a foreign policy of the United States, and to advocate on the behalf of the individuals viewed as persecuted in foreign countries on the account of religion. The Act was signed into law by President Bill Clinton on October 27, 1998.

In August 2012, during the 112th United States Congress, Representatives Bob Turner (R-NY-9) and Ileana Ros-Lehtinen (R-FL-18) introduced a bill with similar provisions as the Protect Cemeteries Act, but the United States House Committee on Foreign Affairs took no action on their bill.

Provisions of the bill

The law amended the International Religious Freedom Act of 1998 to include the desecration of cemeteries among the forms of violations of the right to religious freedom in many countries around the world.

The text of the law contained no official short title, but it was referred to as the Protect Cemeteries Act in floor speeches as well as in media coverage.

Congressional Budget Office report

The Congressional Budget Office (CBO) estimated that implementing this law would have no effect on the federal budget. Pay-as-you-go procedures did not apply to this legislation because it would not affect direct spending or revenues.

Procedural history
H.R. 4028 was introduced into the United States House of Representatives on February 10, 2014 by Rep. Grace Meng (D, NY-6). It was referred to the United States House Committee on Foreign Affairs and the United States House Foreign Affairs Subcommittee on Africa, Global Health, Global Human Rights and International Organizations. On May 28, 2014, the bill passed the House in a voice vote. The United States Senate voted on July 29, 2014 to pass the bill by unanimous consent and President Barack Obama signed the bill into law on August 8, 2014.

Debate and discussion
Rep. Meng, who sponsored the bill, said that "this legislation would be a new and important tool in our fight against the desecration of cemeteries" because it would "combat religiously-motivated vandalism of cemeteries and also prevent developers from building over cemeteries, a new and emerging threat in places where there are no Jewish communities left to protect burial grounds."

See also
List of bills in the 113th United States Congress

References

External links

Library of Congress - Thomas H.R. 4028
beta.congress.gov H.R. 4028
GovTrack.us H.R. 4028
OpenCongress.org H.R. 4028
WashingtonWatch.com H.R. 4028
Congressional Budget Office's report on H.R. 4028

United States federal civil rights legislation
United States foreign relations legislation
United States legislation about religion
Acts of the 113th United States Congress